The proposed Political Constitution of the Republic of Chile was a Constitutional draft written by the Constitutional Convention of Chile between 4 July 2021 and 4 July 2022.  An early draft was made available on 14 May 2022. The final proposal was made available on 4 July 2022.

A national plebiscite was held on 4 September 2022 to determine  whether the public agreed with the proposed Constitution. It was rejected by a margin of 62% to 38%.

The proposal was the first written by a democratically-elected organ, and it sought to replace the 1980 Chilean Constitution, whose original text was ratified by plebiscite during the military dictatorship of Chile, with a dubious legitimacy.

Content 
The text of the proposed Political Constitution of the Republic begins with the preamble approved by the Constitutional Convention:

The content is distributed in eleven chapters, added to a section of transitory regulations located at the end:

General principles and provisions 

Chapter I (articles 1 to 16), called general principles and provisions, contains the fundamental principles of the formation of the State of Chile, its role, its relationship with people, its territory distribution among others. It establishes the Welfare State, its plurinational and ecological character, the form of exercise of sovereignty, the basis of human rights as all State action, the unity of the national territory (but keeping its internal autonomy of the territories), the freedom and equality of people and their relationship with nature, the recognition of participation and equitable representation of women, men, diversities and sexual and gender dissidence in positions of power, the secularism of the state, the recognition of all forms of family, the official Chilean language, its emblems, the way of relating to other nations and the range of international treaties. It also points out the legal value of the Constitution being regulated by itself: it is a rule, therefore its observance is mandatory for any person, institution or group, and obviously also for all State bodies.

Bill of Rights 

Chapter II (articles 17 to 126) is the longest chapter of the constitutional proposal, stating that the end of rights is a dignified life, democracy, peace and the balance of nature, endowing people, indigenous nations and nature as holders of individual and collective rights, committing the action of the State to eliminate access barriers to these rights.

 Right to life.
 Right to personal integrity (physical, psychosocial, sexual and affective).
 Prohibition of the death penalty, torture, enforced disappearance, slavery, human trafficking and exile.
 Right to truth, justice, memory and reparation in case of human rights violations.
 Right to equality before the law.
 Right to non-discrimination
 Right to progressive autonomy of children and adolescents
 Right to the full development of the personality and the use of one's own language
 Right to child protection
 Right to life and environment free of violence (especially for girls, adolescents and people of sexual and gender diversity and dissidence)
 Right to universal accessibility
 Respect for neurodiversity
 Right on request
 Right to dignified treatment, social reintegration and communication (in case of imprisonment)
 Right to a decent old age
 Right to education (including sex education)
 Right to care for the environment
 Right to freedom of education
 Right to health
 The right to social security
 Right to work and free choice, to equitable remuneration, freedom of association, labor participation and strike
 Recognition of domestic work
 Right to care
 Right to decent housing
 Collective right to the city and territory
 Right to food sovereignty
 Right to water and sanitation
 Right to energy
 Right to sport
 Sexual and reproductive rights
 Right to own worldview
 Right to indigenous consent
 Right to freedom of worship
 Right to a dignified death
 Right to freedom of movement
 Right to privacy
 Right to asylum and refuge
 Right to freedom of association
 Right to public demonstration
 Right to access information from the State
 Right to private property
 Right to indigenous property
 Right to freedom to undertake
 Right to consumption and respect for it
 Right to freedom of expression
 Right to create social media
 Right to digital connectivity, computer security, a digital space free of violence and education in the digital space
 Right to personal data protection
 Right to leisure
 Right to cultural and artistic participation
 Right to read
 Right to intellectual property
 Right to research
 Right to cultural heritage
 Right to regeneration of nature
 Right to a healthy and balanced environment
 Right to clean air
 Universal access to mountains, beaches, lakes, lagoons and wetlands
 Access to justice and due process

In addition to functioning as a "bill of rights," this chapter includes the requirements to access Chilean nationality and citizenship, recognizing the rights of persons residing abroad and those who have migrated, the right to guardianship for the reestablishment of violated rights or put an end to irrational arrests, compensation in the event of unjust arrest and imprisonment, and the principles of the "Ombudsman" as an entity for the promotion and protection of human rights guaranteed in this Constitution, in international human rights treaties ratified and in force in Chile in conjunction with the "Children's Rights Ombudsman" whose purpose will be the protection of the aforementioned rights, but in childhood and adolescence.

Nature and environment 
Chapter III (articles 127 to 150) establishes nature as holder of rights, in addition to establishing mechanisms for protecting nature and sanctioning its damage, in addition to a system of waste management, pointing out the ecological and social function of the land.

It also recognizes animals as subjects of special protection against mistreatment, as sentient beings.

The chapter indicates certain goods as common to all people, of an inappropriate nature, such as the territorial sea and its seabed; beaches; the waters, glaciers and wetlands; geothermal fields; the air and the atmosphere; the high mountains, protected areas and native forests; the subsoil, and others declared by law.

Finally, it regulates a water statute, creating a National Water Agency, a minerals statute, and a "defender of nature."

Democratic participation 
Chapter IV, (articles 151 to 164) regulates the form and exercise of democracy in Chile, its exercise is established as direct, participatory, community and representative, in addition to establishing the bases of the Electoral Service.

It guarantees the right to direct democracy via incidental or binding participation of citizens in matters of public interest.

It establishes the possibility for regional and local governments to call a referendum, the popular law initiative (with 3% of the electoral roll to propose a law and 5% to repeal a law).

It configures suffrage as universal, egalitarian, free, direct, personal and secret; mandatory for those who have reached eighteen years of age and voluntary for sixteen and seventeen year olds and for Chileans living abroad.

It establishes norms that govern political parties, on gender parity in elected bodies, ensuring that electoral lists are always headed by a woman, in addition to seats reserved for indigenous peoples, the eradication of gender violence within parties politicians and the incentive for the participation of diversities and sexual and gender dissidents in positions of popular election.

Good governance and public function 

Chapter V (articles 165 to 186) establishes the bases of the public administration, under the principles of probity, transparency and accountability in all its actions, it also ensures the possibility of requesting information by citizens from public bodies.

Likewise, it establishes a Council for Transparency, sanctions the corruption, granting whistleblowers due protection, confidentiality and indemnity, prohibits the participation in public and popularly elected positions of persons convicted of crimes against humanity, sexual crimes and domestic violence, those linked to corruption such as tax fraud, money laundering, bribery, embezzlement of public funds and others established by law.

Establishes a civil service for public officials, a commission that will set the remuneration of the elected authorities, establishing that the public administration is at the service of the person and aims to meet the needs of people and communities, providing universal public services and of quality.

It points out the bases of firefighters in Chile, the tax regime (including the national port policy), the participation of the state in the economy, the requirements to formulate public companies, as well as principles of sustainability and fiscal responsibility with sustainable development and harmony with nature.

Regional state and territorial organization 

Chapter VI, called Regional State and territorial organization (articles 187 to 250), outlines the principles of the nation's internal administration and its degree of regionalization, organizing the state territorially into autonomous territorial entities and special territories.

It grants political, administrative and financial autonomy to the communes, provinces, regions and creates indigenous territorial autonomies for the realization of their goals and interests, giving them legal personality under public law, their own assets and the powers and competencies necessary to govern themselves in response to the interest of the republic, in accordance with the Constitution and the law, having human and nature rights as limits.

It points out principles of solidarity, cooperation, reciprocity and mutual support between territorial entities, under the principles of plurinationality and interculturality, in addition to establishing limits to their competence.

It establishes the commune presided over by mayors and a municipal council —elected by a simple majority—, plus a communal social assembly that has the purpose of promoting popular and citizen participation in public affairs. It will be advisory, incident and representative of the organizations of the commune, as well as neighborhood units.

At the regional level, it establishes a council of mayors, the regional government as the executive body of the autonomous region, a governor –elected by direct vote with an absolute majority, in the first or second round– as director of the regional government, a regional assembly as a collegiate body of regional representation endowed with normative, decision-making and supervisory powers, a regional social council and a Council of Governors of an advisory nature.

Establishes indigenous territorial autonomies endowed with legal personality under public law and their own patrimony, where the indigenous peoples and nations exercise autonomy rights in coordination with the other territorial entities, to rurality as an area of ​​integral development and as special territories to Rapa Nui, the Juan Fernández archipelago (and its adjacent islands) and the Chilean Antarctica.

Legislative branch 

Chapter VII (articles 251 to 278) establishes a bicameral National Congress of an asymmetric nature, with an indirectly elected Chamber of the Regions and a directly elected Congress of Deputies, establishing its duration — 4 years for both chambers —, the form of election of the members of them, their re-election limit —set at just one— and their numbers, age and residence requirements and disabilities to hold office, their particular roles in each chamber, the form of joint sessions, and the form of generate the law and the legislative procedure.

Executive branch 

Chapter VIII (articles 279 to 306) establishes the form of government, presidential in nature and under the head of state and government by a President of the Republic, who will be popularly elected by direct vote. In case of not reaching a majority of the votes in the first round, a second electoral round will be held between the two highest candidates.

It also establishes the requirements of age and residence of the position, the mechanisms of succession of the position, its duration —established in 4 years with immediate reelection only once—, its impediments and its attributions.

It also presents the bases applicable to the ministers of State, the principle of the monopoly of the use of force by the president (limited in accordance with this Constitution, the laws and with respect for human rights), his role as driver of security public (this delegated to a ministry) and the bases of the police and the armed forces as professional, hierarchical, disciplined, obedient and non-deliberative institutions, founded on respect for human rights and from the gender perspective in the performance of their duties. functions.

It also establishes 3 states of constitutional exception: the state of assembly (prior approval of both chambers), the state of siege and the state of catastrophe, in addition to an Oversight Commission dependent on the Congress of Deputies, with joint and multinational composition, made up of deputies, regional representatives and representatives of the Ombudsman's Office, for the control of the measures adopted under the state of exception.

Justice systems 

Chapter IX (articles 307 to 349) establishes the bases of the various justice bodies in Chile, understood as a public function that is exercised on behalf of the peoples and that consists of knowing and judging, through due process, the conflicts of legal relevance and enforce what has been resolved, in accordance with the Constitution and the laws, as well as the international treaties and instruments on human rights to which Chile is a party.

It is exercised exclusively by the courts of justice and the authorities of the indigenous peoples and nations recognized by the Constitution or the laws enacted pursuant to it.

It is made up of the legal systems of the indigenous peoples and nations, the National Justice System (which is made up of the neighborhood justice system, the courts of first instance —civil, criminal, family, labor, common or mixed jurisdiction, administrative, environmental, neighborhood, execution of sentences—, the courts of appeals and the Supreme Court).

Creates a Council of Justice as an autonomous, technical, joint and multinational body, with legal personality and its own assets, whose purpose is to strengthen judicial independence. It is in charge of appointments, governance, management, training and discipline in the National Justice System.

They have as principles the jurisdictional function: the intersectional approach, the principles of parity and gender perspective, the fundamental rights of the people sentencegiven or subject to security measures, and compliance with criminal sanctions and security measures based on respect for human rights and with the objective of serving the sentence and integrating and inserting the sanctioned person into society.

It indicates the bases of the Electoral Qualifying Tribunal as a body that will know the general scrutiny and the qualification of the elections of the authorities elected by popular vote at the national level and of the regional electoral tribunals that are in charge of knowing the general scrutiny and the qualification of the elections. elections at regional, communal and civil society organizations and other organizations recognized by this Constitution or by law.

Autonomous constitutional bodies 

Chapter X called autonomous constitutional bodies (articles 350 to 382) regulates the formation of 6 autonomous constitutional bodies with legal personality and their own assets and under the principle of gender parity in their formation.

The aforementioned bodies include the General Comptroller of the Republic, the Central Bank of Chile, the Public Ministry and the Public Criminal Defense Office. In addition, it creates the National Data Protection Agency and establishes the Constitutional Court

Reform and replacement of the Constitution 
Chapter XI (articles 383 to 388) establishes the form, quorums and modes of reform or create a new Political Constitution of the Republic.

Projects to reform the Constitution may be initiated by message from the President of the Republic, by motion of any of the members of the National Congress, by popular initiative ( by obtaining 10% of signatures on the electoral register) or indigenous. A reform project needs to be approved with the affirmative vote of four-sevenths of both chambers. In matters not provided for in this Chapter, the rules on formation of the law are applicable to the processing of constitutional reform projects, always respecting the indicated quorums.

If the reform project will modify the political regime and the presidential term; the design of the Congress of Deputies or the Chamber of the Regions and the duration of its members; the form of Regional State; fundamental principles and rights; and the reform and replacement chapter
of the Constitution, must be submitted to a plebiscite if it does not reach two-thirds of the votes of both chambers.

The total replacement of the Constitution will be carried out via a plebiscite that establishes a constituent assembly, which may be convened: by popular initiative upon obtaining 25% of the signatures of the electoral roll, by the President of the Republic on (and ratified by three-fifths of both chambers) or by both chambers in joint session by two-thirds.

The constituent assembly will have as its sole purpose the drafting of a proposed constitution, it will be integrated on a parity basis and with independents and seats reserved for indigenous people, with a duration of no less than 18 months, and the ratification of the proposed text will occur by plebiscite.

References

External links

2022 in Chilean law
Constitutions of Chile
Chilean Constitutional Convention
Presidency of Sebastián Piñera
Presidency of Gabriel Boric